The Royal Collegiate church of San Fernando (Spanish: Real Colegiata de San Fernando) is a collegiate church located in the parish of Covadonga, Cangas de Onís, Asturias, Spain. It was declared Bien de Interés Cultural in 1884.

It is the oldest building in the Sanctuary of Covadonga and is located next to the Holy Cave.

See also 
Asturian art
 Basílica de Santa María la Real de Covadonga
Catholic Church in Spain
 List of Bien de Interés Cultural in Asturias
 Santa Cueva de Covadonga

References

External links
The Collegiate at Covadonga website 

Bien de Interés Cultural landmarks in Asturias
Churches in Asturias
Collegiate churches in Spain
Roman Catholic churches in Spain